José Antonio Díaz (born 2 August 1938) is a Cuban fencer. He competed in the individual and team épée events at the 1968 Summer Olympics.

References

1938 births
Living people
Cuban male fencers
Olympic fencers of Cuba
Fencers at the 1968 Summer Olympics
Sportspeople from Havana